The UK Rock & Metal Albums Chart is a record chart which ranks the best-selling rock and heavy metal albums in the United Kingdom. Compiled and published by the Official Charts Company, the data is based on each album's weekly physical sales, digital downloads and streams. In 2012, there were 32 albums that topped the 52 published charts. The first number-one album of the year was Wasting Light, the seventh studio album by Foo Fighters, which was released the previous year. The first new number-one album of the year was A Flash Flood of Colour, the third studio album by Enter Shikari. The final number-one album of the year was Led Zeppelin's live album Celebration Day, which reached number one for the week ending 1 December and remained there for five consecutive weeks until the end of the year.

The most successful album on the UK Rock & Metal Albums Chart in 2012 was Led Zeppelin's Celebration Day, which spent the last five weeks of the year at number one. Muse's sixth studio album The 2nd Law spent four weeks at number one and was the best-selling rock and metal album of the year, ranking 32nd in the UK End of Year Albums Chart. Linkin Park's fifth studio album Living Things also spent four weeks at number one in 2012, while three albums – Wasting Light and Greatest Hits by Foo Fighters, and The Gaslight Anthem's fourth studio album Handwritten – were number one for three weeks in 2012. An additional four albums – A Different Kind of Truth by Van Halen, Weapons by Lostprophets, Born Villain by Marilyn Manson and Rize of the Fenix by Tenacious D – each spent two weeks at number one in 2012.

Chart history

See also
2012 in British music
List of UK Rock & Metal Singles Chart number ones of 2012

References

External links
Official UK Rock & Metal Albums Chart Top 40 at the Official Charts Company
The Official UK Top 40 Rock Albums at BBC Radio 1

2012 in British music
UK Rock and Metal Albums
2012